Amy Cook (born January 30, 1979) is an American musician and singer-songwriter living in Austin, Texas.

Biography
Amy Cook began as an indie artist in Los Angeles, self-releasing records and finding success licensing her songs to television and film.  Cook moved to the small West Texas town of Marfa in 2004. She recorded a collection of lo-fi folk songs that would become "The Bunkhouse Recordings," complete with crickets and coyotes. Soon after, she moved to Austin where she recorded "The Sky Observer's Guide" (a collaboration with Los Angeles artist, Amy Adler) and caught the attention of Alejandro Escovedo, who tapped her for opening duties during his "Real Animal" tour. They followed their traveling act with "Let the Light In," an Escovedo produced record that garnered critical acclaim and featured the song "Hotel Lights," which was spotlighted on many favorites lists in 2010. Patty Griffin sang background vocals on the track. Opening shows for Heartless Bastards, A.A. Bondy, Escovedo, Chris Isaak, Shawn Colvin, Ben Kweller, Tift Merritt, Leo Kottke, Charlie Mars, Ryan Bingham and others followed. Cook is currently on tour with Lucinda Williams (summer 2012).

Cook released Summer Skin, on August 28, 2012, on Roothouse/Thirty Tigers.  The album was produced by Craig Street and featured a band including Chris Bruce, Meshell Ndegeocello, Jonathan Wilson, and David Garza. Special guests include Robert Plant, Ben Kweller, and Patty Griffin.  All songs on the record were written by Amy Cook, with the exception of one co-write with Ben Kweller.

A documentary on Cook, Amy Cook: The Spaces In Between, from Solar Filmworks, was released in 2009 by The Documentary Channel. The film was directed by Todd Robinson and produced by Julian Adams and Robinson. It followed Cook and her band on a short tour across the Southwest and premiered on The Documentary Channel on July 6, 2009. Cook also provided the soundtrack to the Emmy-winning feature-length documentary Amargosa, also directed by Todd Robinson. Amy Cook's songs have appeared in several television shows such as Good Wife, Veronica Mars, Dawson's Creek, Laguna Beach: The Real Orange County, Felicity and Party of Five, amongst others.  She met Leisha Hailey, of Showtime Networks' The L Word, while in Marfa and soon Amy's song "Million Holes in Heaven" was played on the show by Leisha's character during her radio program.

Discography
Summer Skin (Roothouse Records/Thirty Tigers) August 28, 2012
Let the Light In (Roothouse Records) 2010
Fine Day for Flying – EP side project (42 North Recordings) 2009
Sky Observer's Guide (Roothouse Records) 2006
Bunkhouse Recordings (Marfa Records) 2005
The Firefly Sessions (self) 2003
From the 52nd Story (self) 2000

References

External links
Official website
AllMusic bio
"Amy Cook: The Spaces in Between" on IMDB
Amy Cook's "Hotel Lights" on WXPN's My Morning Download

1979 births
Living people
American lesbian musicians
LGBT people from Texas
American LGBT singers
American LGBT songwriters
American women singer-songwriters
American rock musicians
American folk singers
American folk guitarists
Writers from Austin, Texas
Musicians from San Jose, California
Musicians from Austin, Texas
Singer-songwriters from California
Singer-songwriters from Texas
Guitarists from California
Guitarists from Texas
Lesbian singers
Lesbian songwriters
21st-century American women singers
21st-century American singers
People from Marfa, Texas
21st-century American women guitarists
20th-century American LGBT people
21st-century American LGBT people
American lesbian writers